Whipp is a surname. Notable people with the surname include:

Andrew Whipp, English actor who appeared in ITV soap opera Emmerdale as Callum Rennie
Joseph Whipp (born 1941), American actor who has starred in many films and on television
Percy Whipp (1897–1962), Scottish football player
Peter Whipp (born 1950), South African rugby union footballer

See also
Whip (disambiguation)

English-language surnames